The Aprilia RS4 125 (sold as the RS125 since 2016) is a 125 cc class sportbike manufactured by Italian motorcycle firm Aprilia. The four-stroke RS4 125 replaces the extremely popular RS125 two-stroke race replica in Aprilia's lineup. The bike is based on the four-stroke version of the Derbi GPR125.

Specifications
The powerplant is an electronically fuel-injected 4 stroke 4 valve DOHC single cylinder, with a balance shaft. A race kit is available from the manufacturer that boosts power from the standard 15 bhp to 25 bhp.

The RS4 125 is available with a quick-shift system similar to the RSV4, in which the engine halts the torque from the engine based on engine rpm, the amount of throttle being applied, and the speed of the bike. This system allows smooth, fast upshifts without the use of the clutch. This is optional on the standard bike, but included with the GP Replica model.

The chassis is an aluminium perimeter frame with an aluminium swingarm. The brakes consist of a 30 cm steel disc in front with a four-piston radial caliper, and a 22 cm steel disc with a single caliper at the rear. Complementing this for 2017 is Bosch 9.1ML single channel ABS, at the front.

For 2021, the RS125 has undergone significant changes: some restyling at the front, fully digital instruments, a wider 140-section rear tyre, Full-LED headlights, Euro 5 emission compliance and dual-channel ABS. The engine has also been modified: there is a new head, redesigned combustion chamber, new intake and exhaust ducts,  redesigned camshafts and an iridium spark plug. The air intake and filter have been altered and the throttle body has been repositioned. There is a new exhaust system and catalyst, resulting in higher efficiency.

Notes and references

RS4 125
Sport bikes
Motorcycles introduced in 2011